Super Millionaire may refer to:
 Who Wants to Be a Super Millionaire, a spin-off of the American version of Who Wants to Be a Millionaire?
 Super Millionaire, a spin-off of Kuizu $ Mirionea